Future Chaos is the fourth studio album from Bomb The Bass, the Electronica  collective formed around British producer and musician, Tim Simenon. Released in 2008, (13 years after their third album Clear) the album consists of nine tracks produced almost entirely around the Minimoog synthesizer as the core instrument.

Track listing

Personnel
Artwork – Sesper
Mastered By – Mike Marsh
Mixed By – Junk Scientist
Producer – Paul Conboy, Tim Simenon

References

External links
 Future Chaos on Discogs.com

2008 albums
Bomb the Bass albums
Studio !K7 albums
Albums produced by Tim Simenon